Downtown Long Beach station (formerly Transit Mall station) is an at-grade light rail station on the A Line of the Los Angeles Metro Rail system. The station is located in the middle of 1st Street between Pine Avenue and Pacific Avenue in Downtown Long Beach, California, after which the station is named. It is the southern terminus of the A Line.

It is a key part of the Long Beach Transit Mall, which extends along 1st Street between Pacific Avenue and Long Beach Boulevard. As the city's major transit center, this section of 1st Street is closed to private vehicles and only trains and transit vehicles are allowed.

In 2010, a $7 million project was undertaken by Long Beach Transit to upgrade the transit mall.  New bus shelters were constructed, with improved lighting and new artwork.  The project was completed in spring 2011.

During the 2028 Summer Olympics, the station will serve spectators traveling to and from venues located at the Long Beach Sports Park including handball at the Long Beach Arena, temporary facilities for BMX and water polo, along with marathon swimming and triathlon in Long Beach harbor.

Service

Station layout

Hours and frequency

Connections 
The Long Beach Transit Mall is a major hub for municipal bus lines. , the following connections are available:
Flixbus
LADOT Commuter Express: 142
Los Angeles Metro Bus:  , 
Torrance Transit: 3, Rapid 3

Notable places nearby 

The station is within walking distance of the following notable places:
Aquarium of the Pacific
Long Beach Civic Center
Long Beach Performing Arts Center
Pine Avenue Entertainment District
Rainbow Harbor and Shoreline Village

The Pike Entertainment Complex

References 

A Line (Los Angeles Metro) stations
Downtown Long Beach
Bus stations in Los Angeles County, California
Transportation in Long Beach, California
Railway stations in the United States opened in 1990
1990 establishments in California